The 2015 NCAA Division I Men's Lacrosse Championship was the 45th annual single-elimination tournament to determine the national championship for National Collegiate Athletic Association (NCAA) Division I men's college lacrosse.  Eighteen teams competed in the tournament, selected by winning an automatic qualifying conference tournament or as an at-large team based upon their performance during the regular season.  The 18 teams were announced on May 3.

Tournament overview
The first round and play-in games were played at campus sites.  The quarterfinal games were played on May 16 and 17, 2015 at Navy–Marine Corps Memorial Stadium in Annapolis, Maryland (hosted by the United States Naval Academy), and Sports Authority Field at Mile High in Denver (hosted by the University of Denver).

The semifinals were played on May 23, 2015, and the championship on May 25, 2015.  The semifinals and championship were held at Lincoln Financial Field in Philadelphia, and were hosted by Drexel University.

Schools from 10 conferences, the America East Conference, Atlantic Coast Conference (ACC), Big East Conference, Colonial Athletic Association (CAA), Big Ten Conference, Ivy League, Metro Atlantic Athletic Conference (MAAC), Northeast Conference (NEC), Patriot League, and Southern Conference (SoCon) were eligible for automatic bids into the tournament by winning their respective conference tournaments, leaving eight remaining at-large bids for top ranked teams.

Albany (America East), Bryant (NEC), Denver (Big East), Johns Hopkins (Big Ten), Towson (CAA), Colgate (Patriot), Syracuse (ACC), Yale (Ivy), High Point (Southern Conference) and Marist (MAAC) were the 10 schools that received the tournament's automatic bids.

Teams

Results
The Denver Pioneers beat Maryland 10–5 for the school's first national championship, and also the first-ever NCAA men's lacrosse title for a school located outside the Eastern Time Zone.

Wesley Berg was named the tournament's Most Outstanding Player, scoring the overtime winning goal in the semifinals. This was Bill Tierney's first championship since he won with Princeton in 2001, and seventh overall coaching title.

Bracket

 * = Overtime

All-Tournament
 Wesley Berg, A, Denver (Most Outstanding Player)
 Trevor Baptiste, M, Denver
 Ryan LaPlante, G, Denver
 Zach Miller, M, Denver
 Mike Riis, LSM, Denver
 Kyle Bernlohr, G, Maryland
 Matt Neufeldt, LSM, Maryland
 Matt Rambo, A, Maryland
 Sergio Perkovic, M, Notre Dame
 John Crawley, D, Johns Hopkins

References

External links
 Tournament statistics via NCAA

NCAA Division I Men's Lacrosse Championship
Sports in Philadelphia
NCAA Division I Men's Lacrosse Championship
 
NCAA Division I Men's Lacrosse
Lacrosse in Pennsylvania